Shibpur Assembly constituency is an assembly constituency in Howrah district in the Indian state of West Bengal.

Overview
As per orders of the Delimitation Commission, No. 172 Shibpur Assembly constituency is composed of the following: Ward Nos. 8, 9, 21 to 23, 43 and 47 to 50 of Howrah Municipal Corporation.

Shibpur Assembly constituency is part of No. 25 Howrah (Lok Sabha constituency).

Members of Legislative Assembly

Election results

2021

2011

 

.# Swing calculated on Congress+Trinamool Congress vote percentages taken together in 2006.

1977–2006
In the 2006 state assembly elections, Dr. Jagannath Bhattacharya of Forward Bloc won the 165 Shibpur assembly seat defeating his nearest rival Jatu Lahiri of Trinamool Congress.  Contests in most years were multi cornered but only winners and runners are being mentioned. Jatu Lahiri of Trinamool Congress defeated Nepal Kanti Bhattacharjee of Forward Bloc in 2001. Jatu Lahiri of Congress defeated Prabir Kumar Banerjee of Forward Bloc in 1996 and Satyendra Nath Ghose of Forward Bloc in 1991. Satyendra Nath Ghose of Forward Bloc defeated Mrigen Mukherjee of Congress in 1987. Kanailal Bhattacharya of Forward Bloc defeated Utpal Bhowmick of Congress in 1982 and Mrigendra Mukherjee of Congress in 1977.

1967–1972
Mrigendra Mukherjee of Congress won in 1972. Harisadhan Mitra of Communist Party of India (Marxist) won in 1971. M.Banerjee of Congress won in 1967.

References

Assembly constituencies of West Bengal
Politics of Howrah district